Grand Cayman is the largest of the three Cayman Islands and the location of the territory's capital, George Town. In relation to the other two Cayman Islands, it is approximately 75 miles (121 km) southwest of Little Cayman and 90 miles (145 km) southwest of Cayman Brac.

Geography
Grand Cayman encompasses 76% of the territory's entire land mass. Unlike many other Caribbean islands, Grand Cayman is for the most part, flat. This allows for more space to build as the island’s population grows.

Island districts

Grand Cayman Island includes five of the six districts of the Cayman Islands: Bodden Town, East End, George Town, North Side and West Bay.
Bodden Town – Founded in the 1700s, Bodden Town district comprises the central part of Grand Cayman Island, between the George Town and North Side districts. The village of Bodden Town was the original capital of the Cayman Islands. 
East End – The East End district is located at the east side of Grand Cayman Island and consists mostly of the Village of East End, numerous natural attractions, restaurants, and accommodations. 
George Town – The capital of the Cayman Islands and world-famous centre for offshore banking and investments,
North Side – Includes Kaibo and Rum Point. Sand Point Cove in Rum Point is home to a Bioluminescent Bay or Bio Bay.
West Bay – Has numerous tourist attractions including the Cayman Turtle Farm and the Cayman Motor Museum. Towns in the West Bay district include Seven Mile Beach, Hell.

The remaining district is Sister Islands, which consists of the islands of Cayman Brac and Little Cayman.

Flora and fauna

Flora
Of the flora, a good representation of the variety of plant life on Grand Cayman can be found at the Queen Elizabeth II Botanic Park located in the North Side District. Wild banana orchids, ghost orchids, thatch palm trees, red birch trees, mahogany trees and various fruit trees such as avocado, mango, guinep, naseberry, breadfruit, and tamarind. Yellow mastics (Sideroxylon foetidissimum) and black mastics (Terminalia eriostachya) are also seen in the park, as well as on the -long Mastic Trail. Elsewhere outside the park, all of these species can be seen around Grand Cayman, including coconut palm, Casuarina pine, mangrove, and poinciana trees.

Fauna
Fauna seen in various locations around the island include blue iguanas (Cyclura lewisi), Grand Cayman amazon parrots (Amazona leucocephala caymanensis), Central American agouti (Dasyprocta punctata), and Gecarcinus ruricola, a species of land crab. The Cayman Islands Turtle Farm located in the West Bay district raises green sea turtles for their meat and to release into the wild.

Through breeding, the farm produces upwards of 1800 turtles a year. Between 1980 and 2006, the farm released approximately 30,600 turtles to the wild; because of a mark placed on each animal, the released turtles have been seen throughout the Caribbean.

There are four endemic snake species on Grand Cayman and two invasive species. They are all relatively harmless and the largest is the rarely seen invasive corn snake, which may grow to about 5 feet (1.5 m). The smallest averages 2–4 inches (5–10 cm) and is the invasive brahminy blind snake which is also rarely seen. The most common is the endemic Cayman racer snake. (Cubophis cantherigerus) It can grow to approximately 5 feet (1.5 m), but 3-foot (91-cm) specimens are much more common. These snakes tend to race away if encountered and in rare cases will rear up in a threatening manner if cornered. The Cayman racer snake carries a mild venom which it uses to immobilise prey, but in large enough doses it can cause significant swelling and bruising if it latches on for an extended period. A simple bite and release does not usually cause any reaction in humans. The other three endemic snake species are the Cayman Islands dwarf boa, Cayman Brac blind snake and Cayman water snake.

Demographics
Of the three islands, Grand Cayman contains approximately 97% of the territory's entire population.

Economy

Offshore banking
There are just under 600 banks and trust companies in the Grand Cayman, including 43 of the 50 largest banks in the world. Because of this large financial presence on the island, banking, investments, and insurance drive the economy in Grand Cayman.

Tourism

Grand Cayman Island has a number of natural attractions: the blow holes in the East End district, the Mastic Trail that runs north to south through the center of the island, Hell in the West Bay, and the Queen Elizabeth II Botanic Park.

Watersports such as scuba diving and snorkeling are popular activities on Grand Cayman as the island is known for its coral reefs and underwater sea walls along with a number of shipwrecks.

Because of its clubs, resorts, and hotels, Seven Mile Beach has the largest concentration of visitors and tourists on the island.

Infrastructure
Owen Roberts International Airport serves Grand Cayman with domestic and international flights. Cayman Airways has its headquarters on Grand Cayman.

Electrical service for Grand Cayman is provided by Caribbean Utilities Company Ltd., with its corporate headquarters located on North Sound Road. Electricity on Grand Cayman runs on a 120/240 volt electricity system with electrical outlets designed to accommodate a three-pin American plug.

Grand Cayman residents have a choice of telecommunications services from C3, Digicel, FLOW (previously LIME), and Logic.

Olive Hilda Miller was the first manager of The Pines, the first retirement home to be built in the Cayman Islands. She worked there from 1983 until 1991.

Education

The Cayman Islands Education Department operates government schools.

Transition schools 
  Cayman Islands Further Education Centre

Secondary schools operated by government 
 John Gray High School
 Clifton Hunter High School

Primary schools operated by government
 Theoline L. McCoy Primary School
Sir John A. Cumber Primary School
Edna M. Moyle Primary School
George Town Primary School
East End Primary School
Prospect Primary School
Red Bay Primary School
Savannah Primary School

Private schools

Cayman Academy
Cayman International School
Cayman Prep and High School
First Baptist Christian School (ages 3 months – 11 years, grades preschool to 6)
Grace Christian Academy
Montessori School of Grand Cayman
St. Ignatius Catholic School
Triple C School
Truth For Youth School
Wesleyan Christian Academy
Hope Academy

Private universities
St. Matthews University of Medicine/Veterinary Medicine
International College of the Cayman Islands (ICCI)
The Cayman Islands Law School

Public universities
University College of the Cayman Islands (UCCI)

Gallery

See also
Cayman Islands Investment Bureau
Watler Cemetery

References

External links

 Cayman Islands Department of Tourism
 Cayman Travel Guide
 Cayman Islands Government
 
 
 

 
Islands of the Cayman Islands